Ultra High Frequency Follow-On (UFO) satellite system is a United States Department of Defense (DoD) program sponsored and operated by the United States Space Force to provide communications for airborne, ship, submarine and ground forces. The UFO constellation replaced the U.S. DoD Fleet Satellite Communications System (FLTSATCOM) constellation and consisted of eleven satellites. The ground terminal segment consists of equipment and resident personnel at existing satellite communication stations. The satellites are controlled by the 10th Space Operations Squadron (Space Delta 8) located at the Naval Base Ventura County, Point Mugu, California.

Satellite description 
The Ultra high frequency (UHF) satellites primarily served tactical users. UFO provided almost twice as many channels as FLTSATCOM and has about 10% more power per channel. The Extremely high frequency (EHF) package on satellites four through eleven have an Earth coverage beam and a steerable five-degree spot beam that enhances its tactical use. The EHF capability also allows the UFO network to connect to the strategic Milstar system. Satellites eight, nine and ten also carry the Global Broadcast Service antennas that operate in the Ka-band. The Atlas was the launch vehicle of choice; however, space shuttle compatibility existed. The UFO bus and payload weigh . The solar panels spans  and produces 2,500 watts at the end of the planned 14-year lifetime. The UHF system supports stationary and mobile users including manportable, ships, submarines, aircraft and other mobile terminals. The UFO Follow-On system is scheduled for replacement by the Mobile User Objective System (MUOS).

Launch 
First launch of the UFO took place on 25 March 1993, with constellation completion dependent on replacement needs for the aging FLTSATCOM constellation.

References

External links 
 Boeing: UFO System
 GlobalSecurity.org: UFO System
 GlobalSecurity.org: MUOS system

Military communications
Equipment of the United States Space Force
Military space program of the United States
Satellites using the BSS-601 bus